Institute of Politics may refer to:

 Harvard Institute of Politics
 Institute of Politics at the University of North Carolina at Chapel Hill
 New Hampshire Institute of Politics at Saint Anselm College
 Eagleton Institute of Politics at Rutgers University
 Robert J. Dole Institute of Politics at the University of Kansas
 Hinckley Institute of Politics at the University of Utah
 Georgetown Institute of Politics and Public Service at Georgetown University
 Instituts d'études politiques, nine publicly owned institutions of higher learning in France
 University of Chicago Institute of Politics
USC Center for the Political Future at the University of Southern California

Educational institution disambiguation pages